Jigarthanda is a 2014 Indian Tamil-language crime film written and directed by Karthik Subbaraj, and produced by S. Kathiresan of Group Company. The film stars Siddharth and Bobby Simha in leading roles, with a supporting cast consists of Lakshmi Menon, Karunakaran and Guru Somasundaram amongst others. The cinematography for the film is composed by Gavemic U. Ary, and editing is done by Vivek Harshan. The film's soundtrack and background score is composed by Santhosh Narayanan.

Partially inspired by the Korean-language film A Dirty Carnival (2006), Jigarthanda revolves around Karthik (Siddharth) an aspring filmmaker, gets a chance to make a film based on gangsterism, in order to impress a highbrow film director, who critiqued his earlier attempts. In the process, he goes to Madurai, to research about a merciless gangster named Assault Sethu (Simha), who will not hesitate to murder those who try to even write about him.

Released on 1 August 2014, Jigarthanda received critical acclaim from critics and audiences, who praised Subbaraj's writing and direction, the performances of the cast, particularly that of Bobby Simha, and other technical aspects: including cinematography, music, editing. In addition to being a profitable venture for the exhibitors upon its theatrical run, the film was further deemed as one of the most technically brilliant films in Tamil cinema.

The film has won 16 awards from 26 nominations. In March 2015, the film received two National Film Awards for Best Supporting Actor (Bobby Simha) and Best Editing (Vivek Harshan). Simha further won a Filmfare Award for Best Supporting Actor, an Edison Award for Best Villain and a SIIMA Award for Best Supporting Actor, which was the only win at the ceremony as the film received seven nominations. Simha was also nominated for Best Actor in a Negative Role at the same ceremony, but lost to Neil Nitin Mukesh for Kaththi. It was nominated and won two categories at the Ananda Vikatan Cinema Awards: Best Music Director (Santhosh Narayanan), and Best Cinematographer (Gavemic U. Ary). The film received nine nominations at the 9th Vijay Awards and won five – Best Director (Karthik Subbaraj), Best Villain (Simha), Best Cinematographer (Gavemic U. Ary), Best Editor (Vivek Harshan) and Best Background Score (Santhosh Narayanan). In July 2017, The Tamil Nadu government announced State Film Awards for films being released in the period 2009–2014, where Simha won a Special Prize for Best Actor.

Awards and nominations

See also 
 List of Tamil films of 2014

Notes

References

External links 
 Awards for Jigarthanda at the Internet Movie Database

Lists of accolades by Indian film